Oeiras Municipality may refer to:
Oeiras Municipality, Brazil
Oeiras Municipality, Portugal
Municipality name disambiguation pages